The 2022–23 Georgia Tech Yellow Jackets women's basketball team represented the Georgia Institute of Technology during the 2022–23 NCAA Division I women's basketball season. They were led by fourth-year head coach Nell Fortner and played their home games at McCamish Pavilion as members of the Atlantic Coast Conference.

The Yellow Jackets finished the season 13–17 overall and 4–14 in ACC play to finish in a tie for thirteenth place.  As the fourteenth seed in the ACC tournament, they lost their First Round matchup with Boston College.  They were not invited to the NCAA tournament or the WNIT.

Previous season

The Yellow Jackets finished the season 21–11 overall and 11–7 in ACC play to finish in sixth place.  As the sixth seed in the ACC tournament, they defeated Wake Forest in the Second Round before losing to Notre Dame in the Quarterfinals.  They received an at-large bid to the NCAA tournament where they were the ninth seed in the Spokane Regional.  They lost their First Round match-up against Kansas to end their season.

Off-season

Departures

Incoming Transfers

Recruiting Class

Source:

Roster

Schedule
Source:

|-
!colspan=6 style=""| Exhibition

|-
!colspan=6 style=""| Regular Season

|-
!colspan=6 style=""| ACC Women's Tournament

Rankings

See also
 2022–23 Georgia Tech Yellow Jackets men's basketball team

References

Georgia Tech Yellow Jackets women's basketball seasons
Georgia Tech
2022 in sports in Georgia (U.S. state)
2023 in sports in Georgia (U.S. state)